The Lansing Oldsmobiles, Lansing Durants and Lansing Durant Stars were the names of an American football team that played four seasons; from 1919 to 1920 and then from 1922 to 1923. They folded after 1920 but returned in 1922 as the Durants/Durant Stars. They folded for the last time after 1923.

Lansing Oldsmobile/Oldsmobiles
They were founded in 1919 as the Lansing Oldsmobile/Oldsmobiles. In 1919 they had a 6–2 record. They won their first three games against the "Battle Creek A.C.", Detroit Mohawks, and Toledo Navy. Their record in 1920 was 6-1-3. They folded after 1920.

Lansing Durants/Durant Stars
They came back in 1922 as the "Lansing Durants/Durant Stars". In their first season back they had a undefeated record, finishing 8-0-1. In their last season they had a 9–1 record.

References

American football teams established in 1919
American football teams disestablished in 1921
American football teams disestablished in 1924